Patrick Vella is a Maltese judge who was jailed for taking bribes in 2007.

See also
 Noel Arrigo

References 

Living people
Year of birth missing (living people)
Place of birth missing (living people)
Maltese criminals
21st-century Maltese judges
People convicted of bribery
Judges convicted of crimes